Treeson is a fictional character created by Hong Kong illustrator, Bubi Au Yeung. A web comic, vinyl toy, and book have been made about Treeson.

The Story of Treeson 
Treeson's birthday is on August 8, 2005. He is a kind creature who was brought up by the trees of a forest. Discovered by a boy named Ren, the two face their past through their friendship and adventures.

Stories about Treeson are available in two languages: Mandarin Chinese and English. The writing language is extremely simple and children-oriented. Most of the pages are only accompanied with one line of text.
There are currently five different stories about Treeson: Main story (Treeson & Ren), Broken heart story, Firefly story, Urban story, and Before and After. The stories can be read online.

Treeson's Friends 
 Ren: Ren is a very small person and his best friend is a small cart, which help him haul all his stuff. He always carries a backpack when he goes out.
 Newspaper Boy: Newspaper Boy like to roll up newspapers into the shape of a baguette and deliver them to all the families in the area like a fresh breakfast.
 Circle Boy: Circle boy loves drawing circles and dots. He believes the world is like a concentric circle, where everything is the extension of a dot.
 PinB: PinB is a needle cushion who wants to be a chef.

Treeson Toys 
The designer toys are produced by Crazy Label in high quality vinyls. Special editions and blind boxed toys of Treeson and friends are also available. Because many of the figures are special edition, Treseon figures are highly sought after by designer toy collectors, often fetching high prices on eBay.

Treeson's Popularity 
Treeson's fans gather on Treeson's Flickr page, where they post photos of their Treeson toys and participate in discussion boards. Many of the photographs show Treeson figures with other toys such as Blythe dolls.

Treeson's Awards 
 Top 10 Designer Toys of 2006 by Format Magazine
 Toysrevil’s top 6 vinyl toys of 2006
 Plastic and Plush: 2006 Toy Awards: Toy of the Year

References

External links
 Official website
  crazylabel.com
 Flickr

Art toys

de:Urban Vinyl
sv:Designer toys